Baishi Town is an urban town in Xiangtan County, Xiangtan City, Hunan Province, People's Republic of China.  it had a population of 37,900 and an area of . Baishi means "white stone."

Administrative division
The town is divided into 26 villages and 1 community, the following areas: Wangjianglou Community , Yanhu Village , Yinjiachong Village , Lianhua Village , Guangqiao Village , Shuikou Village , Tianqiao Village , Xinhe Village , Xinqiaopu Village , Tanjialong Village , Xinghua Village , Baishi Village , Tianping Village , Xiangxing Village , Huangmao Village , Yandun Village , Hutian Village , Shenxi Village , Tankou Village , Xianghe Village , Longfeng Village , Honhshi Village , Yong'an Village , Zhaogong Village , Jinhu Village , Tuanshanpu Village , and You'ai Village .

History
In 2007, Baishi Town was built.

Economy
Rice is important to the economy.

Culture
Huaguxi is the most influence local theater.

Notable people
Ma Li'an, grandfather of Ma Ying-jeou.
Qi Baishi, was an influential Chinese painter.

References

External links

Divisions of Xiangtan County